Jeong Sang-bin (born 1 April 2002) is a South Korean footballer who plays as a forward for Wolverhampton Wanderers.

Club career
On 28 January 2022, Jeong joined Premier League club Wolverhampton Wanderers and was immediately loaned to Grasshoppers in Swiss Super League.

On 17 March 2023, Grasshoppers and Wolves mutually agreed to terminate Jeong's loan early. Due to injuries, he only appeared in 15 games and started in just five.

International career
He made his debut for South Korea national football team on 9 June 2021 in a World Cup qualifier against Sri Lanka and scored one of the goals in the 5–0 victory.

Career statistics

Club

Notes

International goals
Scores and results list South Korea's goal tally first.

References

2002 births
Living people
South Korean footballers
South Korea youth international footballers
South Korea international footballers
Association football forwards
Suwon Samsung Bluewings players
Grasshopper Club Zürich players
South Korean expatriate footballers
Expatriate footballers in Switzerland
South Korean expatriate sportspeople in Switzerland
People from Cheonan
Sportspeople from South Chungcheong Province